Alibaba Aradajanu Dongalu is a 1993 Indian Telugu-language comedy film, produced by K. Chinni under the Melody Movies banner and directed by E. V. V. Satyanarayana starring Rajendra Prasad, Ravali and Srikanya, with music composed by Vidyasagar. The film was released on 31 December 1993 and was a box office success, receiving recognition as one of the finest comedy films in Telugu cinema.

Plot 
The film revolves around an incompetent cop Alibaba (Rajendra Prasad) and 6 petty thieves maintaining two different gangs Kotaiah & Co (Kota Srinivasa Rao, Ali and Mallikarjuna Rao) and Brahmam Brothers (Brahmanandam, Rallapalli, and Chidatala Appa Rao). Both gangs always compete with each other and create turmoil & turbulence in the city with their thefts. Alibaba is specially appointed to catch them. Meanwhile, both the gangs has two sisters Pulandevi (Ravalli) & Pooja Bedi (Srikanya) and two of them fall for Alibaba. So, the 6 thieves ploy, mislead Alibaba and couples up him with both. At present, Alibaba struck & struggle in between his two wives and 6 brothers-in-law. The rest of the story is a comic tale that how get rid of these problems.

Cast 

 Rajendra Prasad as Alibaba
 Ravali as Phoolan Devi
 Srikanya as Pooja Bedi
 Satyanarayana as S.P.
 Kota Srinivasa Rao as Kotayya & co
 Brahmanandam as Brahmam Brothers
 Ali as Kotayya & co
 Mallikharjuna Rao as Kotayya & co
 Rallapalli as Brahmam Brothers
 Giribabu as Alibaba's Babai
 Viswanathan as Appaji
 Ironleg Sastri as Pindala Sastry
 Tirupathi Prakash as Lady constable
 Chidatala Appa Rao as Brahmam Brothers
 Dham as constable
 Vidyasagar
 Silk Smitha as SP's wife
 Nirmalamma as Balamani

Soundtrack 

Music composed by Vidyasagar.

Reception 
In their obituary of director E. V. V. Satyanarayana, The Times of India listed Alibaba Aradajanu Dongalu as among "some of his super-hit comedy and entertaining films".

References

External links 
 

Films directed by E. V. V. Satyanarayana
Films scored by Vidyasagar
1990s Telugu-language films